Henry Logan Memorial African Methodist Episcopal Church is a historic African Methodist Episcopal church at Ann & 6th Streets in Parkersburg, Wood County, West Virginia. It was built in 1891, and is a brick and stone church building in a vernacular Romanesque style.  It features three round arched stained glass windows on the front facade and a square, pyramidal roofed corner tower.

It was listed on the National Register of Historic Places in 1982.

References

External links

African-American history of West Virginia
African Methodist Episcopal churches in West Virginia
Churches in Wood County, West Virginia
Buildings and structures in Parkersburg, West Virginia
Churches on the National Register of Historic Places in West Virginia
Churches completed in 1891
Romanesque Revival church buildings in West Virginia
National Register of Historic Places in Wood County, West Virginia